Ahmad Karimi-Hakkak (born February 1944 in Mashhad, Iran) is a Persian literary figure and Iranologist.

Life

Education
Ahmad Karimi-Hakkak holds a BA in English Literature and a Teacher's Certificate from the University of Tehran and Military University, Tehran respectively. He got a Masters in English Literature from the University of Missouri-Kansas City and a PhD in Comparative Literature from Rutgers University.

Career
Ahmad Karimi-Hakkak was Professor of Near Eastern Languages and Civilizations at the University of Washington for nineteen years. He is currently a professor and founding director of the Roshan Center for Persian Studies in the School of Languages, Literatures and Cultures at the University of Maryland, College Park.

Karimi-Hakkak has written nineteen books and over one hundred major scholarly articles. He has contributed articles on Iran and Persian literature to many reference works, including Encyclopædia Britannica, Encyclopædia Iranica, and The Encyclopedia of Translation Studies. A specialist in modern Persian literature, his works have been translated into French, Dutch, Spanish, Russian, Greek, Arabic, Japanese, and Persian. He has served as president of the Association for Iranian Studies (formerly, International Society for Iranian Studies) and other professional academic organizations.

Karimi-Hakkak's was awarded the Yarshater lectureship for the year 2003 for contributions to Iranian Studies. Karimi-Hakkak was also invited by the Centre of Persian and Central Asian Studies-Jawaharlal Nehru University, New Delhi as Visiting Professor in 2011.

He is a board member of the National Iranian American Council (NIAC).

Works and Publications
 
 Adab-e Sarf-e Chai Dar Hozour-e Gorg آداب صرف چای در حضور گرگAdab-e Sarf-e Chai Dar Hozour-e Gorg آداب صرف چای در حضور گرگ,  (Contributor), 1993 
 Edges of Poetry: Selected Poems (Bilingual Edition), 1995 (Translator)
 Remembering the Flight: Twenty Poems, 1997 (Translator)
 IRANIAN STUDIES Selections from the Literature of Iran, 1977-1997, 1997
  
 Persian Tutor, 1999 
  Walking with the Wind (Voices and Visions in Film, 2), 2002 
 Strange Times, My Dear: The PEN Anthology of Contemporary Iranian Literature, (Kindle Edition), 2012 (Editor)
 An Eyeful of Earth, An Eyeful of Ocean: Selected Love Poems of Mandana Zandian, 2014 
 literature:its existence, its appearance / (بود و نمود سخن: متن ادبی، با فتار اجتماعی و تاریخ ادبیات ( گزیده مقاله های ادبی , Persian Edition, 2016 
 A Fire of Lilies: Perspectives on Literature and Politics in Modern Iran (Iranian Studies Series), 2020

See also 
 Iranian studies
 Persian literature

References

External links 
 Webpage on UMD website
 Ahmad Karimi-Hakkak's profile at SOAS University of London
 List of Author's books, Thriftbooks
  Ahmad Karimi-Hakkak at the Near Eastern Languages and Cultures, University of California, Los Angeles

Iranian Iranologists
Iranian writers
People from Mashhad
Living people
American people of Iranian descent
Iranian expatriate academics
Year of birth missing (living people)